The Müritz (from Slavic "little sea") is a lake in Mecklenburg-Vorpommern, northern Germany.

It is fed and drained by the river Elde. Part of the Müritz and adjacent forests and wetlands are protected by the Müritz National Park. The former Müritz district was named after the lake. The biggest towns bordering the lake are Waren (Müritz) and Röbel, both major centres of tourism in the Mecklenburg Lake District.

Lake Müritz is part of the Müritz-Elde Waterway, a Class I federal waterway. It is managed by the Lauenburg Waterway and Shipping Authority (Wasser- und Schifffahrtsamt Lauenburg).

Geography

Divisions 
The Müritz Basin is divided into several large bays. Unlike the shallow eastern part of the lake, the western side is divided into several channel-like inlets like the Bays of Röbel and Sietow (Röbeler Bucht and Sietower Bucht). By the town of Waren on the northern shore of the lake is the Binnenmüritz, which contains the deepest point of the lake (−31 metres), and only has a narrow strait connecting it to the main basin of Lake Müritz. At the southern shore is the Little Müritz (Kleine Müritz) from which the Müritzarm and the Müritzsee branch off further to the south. The Müritz is crossed by the River Elde from south to north and has a link to the Kölpinsee in the west from the Binnenmüritz via the Reeck Canal (also Eldenburg Canal) which is a good two kilometres long. Because it also feeds the River Havel to the east via the Mirow Canal, which is part of the Müritz-Havel Waterway, and the Bolter Canal as well as via the chains of adjoining lakes, it has artificially been turned into a bifurcated waterway.

Creation 
Lake Müritz was formed during the Weichselian glaciation between the Pomeranian and the Frankfurt Stages. Originally the entire Mecklenburg Lake District was a huge lake, that split into several smaller lakes, linked to one another, as a result of a fall in sea level.

Water level 
The water level of Lake Müritz has changed several times in the preceding centuries, primarily as a result of human influences.

Settlements 
The largest town on Lake Müritz is Waren (Müritz). Other settlements are (clockwise) Rechlin, Priborn, Vipperow, Ludorf, Röbel/Müritz, Gotthun, Sietow and Klink.

References

External links

 
Müritz-Nationalpark
Müritzeum - Nature Discovery Centre in Waren
Official website of Waren (Müritz)
Official website of Röbel (Müritz)

Lakes of Mecklenburg-Western Pomerania
Federal waterways in Germany